The fourth season of the CBS crime drama series Hawaii Five-0 premiered on Friday, September 27, 2013 and concluded on May 9, 2014. The season consisted of 22 episodes.

Cast and characters

Main cast

 Alex O'Loughlin as Lieutenant Commander Steven "Steve" McGarrett, United States Naval Reserve
 Scott Caan as Detective Daniel "Danno" Williams
 Daniel Dae Kim as Lieutenant Chin Ho Kelly
 Grace Park as Officer Kono Kalakaua
 Masi Oka as Dr. Max Bergman
 Michelle Borth as Lieutenant Catherine Rollins, United States Navy (retired), later Five-0 member
 Chi McBride as HPD Captain Lou Grover

Recurring
 Taylor Wily as Kamekona
 Dennis Chun as HPD Sergeant Duke Lukela
 Ian Anthony Dale as Adam Noshimuri
 Teilor Grubbs as Grace Williams
 Shawn Mokuahi-Garnett as Flippa
 Justin Bruening as Lieutenant Commander William "Billy" Harrington, United States Navy (retired)
 Brian Yang as Charlie Fong
 Richard T. Jones as Governor Sam Denning
 Jorge Garcia as Jerry Ortega

Guest stars

Episodes 

The number in the "No. overall" column refers to the episode's number within the overall series, whereas the number in the "No. in season" column refers to the episode's number within this particular season. The titles of each episode are in the Hawaiian language, though its English translations are directly underneath. "Production Code" refers to the order in which the episodes were produced. "U.S. viewers (millions)" refers to the number of viewers in the United States in millions who watched the episode as it was aired.

Production

Development
On March 27, 2013, while the third season was still airing, CBS renewed Hawaii Five-0 for a fourth season. When CBS announced its fall schedule for the 2013-14 television season it was revealed that the series would undergo a time slot change moving from Monday nights at 10 PM ET to Friday nights at 9 PM ET. The season premiere aired on September 27, 2013. For the fourth season production of the series moved to a sound stage at Diamond Head Film Studios where the original Hawaii Five-O and Magnum, P.I. as well as Lost previously filmed at. Filming on the season began on July 9, 2013 with a traditional Hawaiian blessing. On October 11, 2013, it was announced that the show was planning a "fan built episode." Fans and viewers of the series were able to vote on several plot elements of the show including the scene of the crime, the victim, the murder weapon, the suspect, and the scene of the takedown. Once production began fans were also able to vote for additional elements such as props, cast wardrobe, music, and the episode title. The episode aired as the seasons eighteenth episode on April 4, 2014.

Casting
On June 14, 2013, it was announced that Jorge Garcia would guest star in an episode early on in the season. It was also announced that Chi McBride had been cast in a guest role to play character from the original series, Captain Lou Grover; with the possibility of the role to later become recurring. Tim Daly was confirmed to be guest starring in an episode as a Texas Ranger also with the possibility for the role to become recurring. It was reported that Henry Ian Cusick would guest star in the season's premiere episode as a character called Ernesto, a member of a terrorist group called the National Liberation Movement. Nick Jonas also guest starred in one episode as computer hacker Ian Wright. After appearing in multiple episodes as a recurring character it was revealed that McBride would be upped to a series regular for the remainder of the season. McBride began receiving main billing in the tenth episode of the season, "Hoʻonani Makuakane". Jonas later reprised his role once again in the season finale. Mark Dacascos also reprised his role as Wo Fat in the seasons premiere and finale episodes. Garcia quickly became a recurring character when he appeared in three more episodes later in the season. Due to the popularity of his character he was subsequently upgraded to a series regular beginning with the fifth season. On March 27, 2014 it was announced that Michelle Borth would depart the series at the end of the season. She made her final appearance as a series regular in the seasons penultimate episode. Borth has continued to make guest appearances in all subsequent seasons including a recurring role early in the sixth season.

Reception

Ratings

Home Video Release

References

External links 
 
 
 List of Hawaii Five-0 episodes at The Futon Critic
 

2013 American television seasons
2014 American television seasons
Hawaii Five-0 (2010 TV series) seasons
Television about the internment of Japanese Americans